The following is a list of the head coaches of the Port Adelaide Football Club, an Australian rules football club who have coached the club in the SAFA, SAFL, Wartime Leagues, SANFL and the AFL (1997–present). Since 1870 Port Adelaide has had 39 head coaches lead the club.

External links 
Official Website of the Port Adelaide Magpies Football Club
Official Website of the Port Adelaide Football Club
Port Adelaide Coaches Win–loss records at AFL Tables

Australian rules football records and statistics
Port Adelaide Football Club coaches

Football